Bernhard "Bernd" Dürnberger (born 17 September 1953 in Kirchanschöring) is a former German football player. A defensive midfielder, he played for thirteen seasons with Bayern Munich, from 1972 to 1985, winning eleven major trophies. Thus, together with Heinz Stuy, the goalkeeper of the golden era of AFC Ajax, he holds the record for being the player having won the most major club titles without having ever played for the national team of his country. He played in a total of 375 Bundesliga games and scored 38 goals. He never earned an international cap at senior level but appeared 78 times (9 goals) in the European cup competitions for Bayern Munich.

Honours
Bayern Munich
 Bundesliga: 1972–73, 1973–74, 1979–80, 1980–81, 1984–85
 DFB-Pokal: 1981–82, 1983–84
 European Cup: 1973–74, 1974–75, 1975–76
 Intercontinental Cup: 1976

References

External links
 
 

1953 births
Living people
German footballers
Germany B international footballers
Germany youth international footballers
Association football midfielders
FC Bayern Munich footballers
Bundesliga players
UEFA Champions League winning players